Bletchley is a constituent town of Milton Keynes, Buckinghamshire, England. It is situated in the south-west of Milton Keynes, and is split between the civil parishes of Bletchley and Fenny Stratford and West Bletchley.

Bletchley is best known for Bletchley Park, the headquarters of Britain's World War II codebreaking organisation, and now a major tourist attraction. The National Museum of Computing is also located on the Park.

History

Origins and early modern history
The town name is Anglo-Saxon and means Blæcca's clearing. It was first recorded in manorial rolls in the 12th century as Bicchelai, then later as Blechelegh (13th century) and Blecheley (14th–16th centuries). Just to the south of Fenny Stratford, there was Romano-British town, M on either side of Watling Street, a Roman road.

Bletchley was originally a minor village on the outskirts of Fenny Stratford, of lesser importance than Water Eaton. Fenny Stratford fell into decline from the English Civil War (17c) onwards. The arrival of the London and Birmingham Railway (now part of the West Coast Main Line) from 1838, and particularly of the branch lines to Bedford (1846) and Buckingham (1850) (that together subsequently became the  –  "Varsity Line"), made the station at Bletchley a substantial one. Bletchley grew to eclipse both its antecedents.

Almost forty years after the construction of Bletchley railway station, the 1884/5 Ordnance Survey shows Bletchley as still just a small village around the C of E parish church at Bletchley Park, and a (separate) hamlet near the Methodist chapel and Shoulder of Mutton public house at the junction of Shenley Road/Newton Road with Buckingham Road. (These districts are known today as Old Bletchley and Far Bletchley). The major settlement of the time is nearby Fenny Stratford.

The Bletchley area is rich in Oxford Clay, which has long been used for bricks. Brick-making has taken place on the Newton Leys site and the surrounding area from the late 19th century, circa 1897. Bletchley Brickworks closed in September 1990

"Bigger, Better, Brighter" – Bletchley in the 20th century

In the urban growth of the Victorian period brought by the railway, the town merged with Fenny Stratford. The latter had been constituted an urban district (with Simpson) in 1895, and Bletchley was added in 1898. By 1911, the population of the combined parishes was 5,166 but the balance between them had changed: in that year, the name of the local council (Urban District) changed from Fenny Stratford UD to Bletchley UD. The 1926 Ordnance Survey shows the settlements beginning to merge, with large private houses along the Bletchley Road between them. In 1933, the newly founded Bletchley Gazette began a campaign for a "Bigger, Better, Brighter, Bletchley". As the nation emerged from World War II, Bletchley Council renewed its desire to expand from its 1951 population of 10,919. By mid-1952, the council was able to agree terms with five London Boroughs to accept people and businesses from bombed-out sites in London. This trend continued through the 1950s and 1960s, culminating in the GLC-funded Lakes Estate in Water Eaton parish, even as Milton Keynes was being founded. Industrial development kept pace, with former London businesses relocating to new industrial estates in Mount Farm and Denbigh – Marshall Amplification being the most notable. With compulsory purchase, Bletchley Road (now renamed to Queensway after a royal visit in 1966) became the new high street with wide pavements where front gardens once lay. Houses near the railway end were replaced by shops but those nearer Fenny Stratford became banks and professional premises. At the 1971 Census, the population of the Bletchley Urban District was 30,642.

Bletchley in Milton Keynes

Proposals for a new city in North Buckinghamshire had been floated from the early 1960s. Bletchley had fought to be the centre of the proposed new city, but it was not to be. The 1971 Plan for Milton Keynes placed Central Milton Keynes on a completely new hill-top site four miles further north, half way to Wolverton. Bletchley was relegated to the status of suburb. Bletchley thrived in the early years of the growth of Milton Keynes, since it was the main shopping area. Bletchley centre was altered considerably when the Brunel Shopping Centre was built in the early 1970s, creating a new end to Queensway. (Previously, Queensway – formerly known as Bletchley Road – was a continuous run from Fenny Stratford to Old Bletchley). Bletchley's boom came to an end when the new Central Milton Keynes Shopping Centre was built and commercial Bletchley has declined as a retail destination since then.

Bletchley Park

Within the West Bletchley parish, in the Church Green district, is Bletchley Park, which, during the Second World War, was home to the Government Code and Cypher School. The German Enigma code was cracked here by, amongst others, Alan Turing. Another cipher machine was solved with the aid of early computing devices, known as Colossus. The park is now a museum, although many areas of the park grounds have been sold off for housing development.

Wilton Hall

The nearby Wilton Hall was built in 1943 as part of the Bletchley Park estate and was used by the government as a meeting place by day and a music and dance venue by night. After World War II, the venue continued to remain open and played host to musicians such as Lulu and The Rolling Stones.

In recent years, the building was slated for demolition after its closure in 2019. However, after residents and the local MP rejected calls for the demolition of the site due to historical value, the building was sold to a new partnership in 2020 who have refurbished and reopened the building in 2022.

Civil parishes: Bletchley and Fenny Stratford, and West Bletchley
For more details about the districts of Bletchley, see these civil parish articles.

The Bletchley built-up area is divided for administrative purposes into two civil parishes, Bletchley and Fenny Stratford and West Bletchley

The districts that make up Bletchley and Fenny Stratford CP are: Brickfields (includes the Blue Lagoon), Central Bletchley, Denbigh (including Denbigh North), Eaton Manor, Fenny Stratford, Granby, Manor Farm, Mount Farm, Newton Leys and Water Eaton (includes "Lakes Estate").  At the 2011 Census, the population of the parish was 15,313.

West Bletchley CP covers that part of Milton Keynes that is south of Standing Way (A421), west of the West Coast Main Line and north of the Varsity Line. At the 2011 Census, the population of the parish was 15,313. The districts and neighbourhoods in the parish are: Church Green (including Bletchley Park); Far Bletchley; Old Bletchley; West Bletchley (district); Whaddon (ward around Whaddon Way, not to be confused with nearby Whaddon in Aylesbury Vale).

Transport

Rail
The town is served by Bletchley railway station, on Sherwood Drive, which is on both the West Coast Main Line and the Bletchley-Bedford Marston Vale Line, a constituent part of the former Oxford-Cambridge Varsity Line that closed in 1967. Eventually, full services through to Cambridge and the East of England are planned, as is the establishment of a strategic railway connecting Eastern, Central, Southern and Western England.

Road
Major Milton Keynes grid roads serving the town include Watling Street (which has the V4 designation between Denbigh North and Stony Stratford), V7 Saxon Street (connecting Central Bletchley with the rest of the city) and H8 Standing Way (A421) (which runs westwards towards Buckingham, Oxford and the M40, and eastwards through the south-east of the city towards Bedford, Cambridge and the M1 at Junction 13). The A5 passes along the eastern flank of Fenny Stratford, connecting it and Bletchley with the city centre, the A422, A508 and A509 roads. The A4146 southern bypass serves Water Eaton, Newton Leys and Fenny Stratford.

Watling Street, originally the Roman road between Dover and Wroxeter and serving Magiovinium (the Romano-British town that preceded Fenny, runs through Fenny Stratford and on through Stony Stratford).

Bus
Bletchley is MK's main southern interchange point for cross-city and rural bus services. The town is served by Arriva buses 4, 5, 6, 150, F70/F77 and M6; Z&S Transport bus 50; Red Rose bus 100; and Star Travel bus 162.

The town's main bus station is located on South Terrace, just east of V7 Saxon Street in Central Bletchley.

Sport and leisure
Bletchley has a football club, Bletchley FC, and a rugby union club, Bletchley RUFC, both of which play at Manor Fields just south of Fenny Stratford.

Bletchley Leisure Centre was completed in 2009, replacing the original 1970s building.

Stadium MK, home of Milton Keynes Dons is at the northern edge of the town. This area also contains what is known as the "MK1" shopping centre. This includes shops, restaurants, and an Odeon cinema (which moved to MK1 from The Point building in Milton Keynes Central in 2015).

Political representation
Bletchley is divided between three electoral wards of Milton Keynes City Council, consisting of Bletchley East (3 Labour), Bletchley West (2 Labour, 1 Conservative) and Bletchley Park (1 Labour, 2 Conservative), and is in the parliamentary constituency of Milton Keynes South.

ONS built up area

At the 2011 census, the population of the area was 37,114.

For the 2001 census, it designated a (larger) "urban sub-area"  that approximates to the boundaries of the former Bletchley Urban District Council at the time of the designation of Milton Keynes. It also included that part of Winslow Rural District that fell within the designation. In outline, the ONS Sub-area consisted of Bletchley and Fenny Stratford Civil Parish, West Bletchley Civil Parish and part of Shenley Brook End Civil Parish (specifically Furzton, Emerson Valley, Tattenhoe and Snelshall). At the 2001 Census, the population of the Sub-area was 47,176.

See also
Bletchley TMD – traction maintenance depot

Notes

References

Further reading
 Edward Legg, Early History of Bletchley Park 1235–1937, Bletchley Park Trust Historic Guides series, No. 1, 1999 

 
Towns in Buckinghamshire
Milton Keynes